Liivo Leetma (born 20 January 1977) is an Estonian football manager and former professional player. He played the position of midfielder. He won a total of 36 international caps for the Estonia national football team.

Club career
Former clubs include JK Tervis Pärnu, Lelle SK, FC Flora Tallinn, JK Viljandi Tulevik, FC Levadia Tallinn, Paide JK, FC KooTeePee, FC TVMK Tallinn, JK Tallinna Kalev, JK Nõmme Kalju and Paide Linnameeskond.

External links
 Nõmme Kalju profile

1977 births
Living people
Estonian footballers
Estonia international footballers
Meistriliiga players
Veikkausliiga players
Expatriate footballers in Finland
Estonian expatriate sportspeople in Finland
FC Flora players
Viljandi JK Tulevik players
FCI Levadia Tallinn players
FC TVMK players
JK Tallinna Kalev players
Nõmme Kalju FC players
Paide Linnameeskond players
Grankulla IFK players
Estonian expatriate footballers
People from Kose Parish
Association football midfielders
JK Tervis Pärnu players
Estonian football managers